The Heul Girl (Dutch: Heulmeisje) was a murder victim found on 24 October 1976 at the former parking De Heul on the A12, in Maarsbergen, Netherlands. Her identity has never been established.

Case summary 
It was assumed for many years that the naked, leaf-covered body belonged to a missing 18-year-old girl from a neighboring village. However, that theory was ruled out in 2006 when the missing girl, now an adult, reported to the police.

Based on later research on the epiphyseal plates, the Heul Girl would have been 12 to 15 years old at the time of death, putting her date of birth between 1960 and 1965. Isotope research on her teeth showed that the decedent probably lived between the Ruhr and Eifel regions of Germany for the first seven years of her life. Around 1975, the child was likely in East Germany or Eastern Europe. The year prior to her death, she supposedly stayed in either West Germany or the Netherlands. In that year, the girl received particularly poor nutrition, which may indicate extreme poverty or a possible kidnapping.

In 2012, a witness stated that in 1976, multiple people saw the girl being "thrown out" by two men between the ages of 30 and 40.

In 2013, both the Opsporing Verzocht program and the German variant Aktenzeichen XY... ungelöst aired episodes on the case.

In 2016, the German judiciary gave permission to start a large-scale investigation based on the girl's DNA. This is a joint operation by both countries, in which DNA databases from both countries will be utilised. At the end of 2018, the Utrecht police confirmed that DNA testing had not started yet.

See also 
List of unsolved murders

References

External links 

Netherlands Police

1960s births
1976 deaths
1976 crimes
Deaths by person in the Netherlands
Female murder victims
German expatriates in the Netherlands
German people murdered abroad
Incidents of violence against women
People murdered in the Netherlands
Unidentified murder victims
Unsolved murders in the Netherlands
Violence against women in the Netherlands